The French Engineering Works or FEW, is a manufacturer, exporter and importer of High Speed Steel cutting tools. The firm was founded in Johannesburg, South Africa, in 1918 by Herman Moser to manufacture rock drill spares for the mining industry in Johannesburg. 

The business diversified into manufacture of precision tools, and HSS cutting tools for the metal industry. Their product range includes taps, dies, bits, cutters, toolbits, and thread-rolling dies (flat and circular).

References

External links
 

Tool manufacturing companies of the United Kingdom
Tool manufacturing companies of South Africa
Manufacturing companies based in Johannesburg
Manufacturing companies established in 1918
Technology companies established in 1918
South African brands